Kota Tampan is a state constituency in Perak, Malaysia, that has been represented in the Perak State Legislative Assembly.

Demographics

History

Polling districts
According to the federal gazette issued on 30 March 2018, the Kota Tampan constituency is divided into 15 polling districts.

Representation history

Election Results

References

 

Perak state constituencies